Ranks and rank insignia of the Soviet Armed Forces in the period 1943–1955 were characterised by a number of changes in the armed forces of the Soviet Union, including the reintroduction of rank insignia badges and the adoption of a number of higher ranks.

Changes 
In conjunction with the permanent increase of the manpower strength of the Soviet armed forces, the service branches and arms were formed by orders of the People' Commissariat of Defence, consisting of artillery, air force, air defence forces, signals corps, corps of engineers and the armoured corps. Major combat support units up to command level were established. This process was characterized by a need for well qualified command staff, in a suitable rank structure. The Soviet state – and party administration – responded to these challenges by the introduction of additional higher ranks, as well as by reintroducing the traditional Russian rank insignia.

A new rank group at OF-9 level (equivalent to the general of the branch in the Wehrmacht and the Imperial Russian Army) was introduced, named marshal of the branch or chief marshal of the branch. 

In January 1943 the ranks of marshal of the air force, marshal of the artillery and marshal of the armoured corps came into existence. In October 1943 it was followed by the additional ranks marshal of the communication troops, and  marshal of the engineer troops, and the equivalent chief marshal of the branch ranks were added.

Generalissimus of the Soviet Union 
The highest rank of generalissimus of the Soviet Union was created in October 1943, as an individual award to Stalin, the head of state and party chief, and functioned as supreme commander on all Soviet armed forces. Promotion to this rank was limited explicitly to wartime. The instruction was conveyed by an order to the front commanders-in-chief on 26 June 1945, however, Stalin refused to officially implement the rank.

Ranks and distinction insignia for the land forces and air force 
The introduction of new distinction insignia to the officer corps of the Red Army came by order of the Presidium of the Supreme Soviet on 6 January 1943. Selected were two versions of shoulder straps or epaulettes, one for everyday uniforms and the second for field use (breadth 6 cm, length 14 to 16 cm, depending on body size). On 15 January 1943 the introduction of new uniforms was decided.

Corps colours 
The corps colours that were introduced in 1935, remained in use with minor changes. The padding of the newly introduced shoulder straps were made from wool cloth, designed in branch of service colours with piping. Command staff wore silver or gold stars and characteristic metallic branch badges.

Enlisted men and non-commissioned officers 
The shoulder board padding indicated the appropriate corps colour of service branch, corps or special appointment, with coloured border piping.

Junior and senior officers

General officers

Any other insignia 
Regimental numbers in gold lettering were placed on other ranks' shoulder straps along with the emblem of the armed service, branch, special troop, or appointment. For commanders of battle units or task forces the emblem was gold coloured, for others it was silver.

Enlisted men and non-commissioned officers

Variations 
Field and service uniform as shown for Senior sergeant.

Officer up to сommander-in-chief

Marshals of the branch
The rank of Army general was only awarded to officers of the army, all other branches and services were promoted to the ranks of marshal and chief marshal of the branch.

Variations
Field, service and engineering uniform for various officers.

Ranks and rank insignia of the Soviet Navy 
By decree of the Presidium of the Supreme Soviet on 15 February 1943 on "distinction insignia to the Soviet Navy" the introduction of shoulder straps and epaulettes took effect, marking the début of Imperial Russian Navy-style insignia to the Soviet Navy. As the navy also had coastal services, ground ranks similar to the Red Army and Air Force were introduced with their respective insignia to be used by the coastal service personnel. These ranks were also used by the navy's medical corps and technical services. Shoulder rank insignia were in dark blue shoulder boards (gold on the dress uniform only for officers).

Naval officers and flag officers

Naval ratings (naval service)

Ranks and insignia of naval ground and technical services

Officers

Other ranks

See also 
 History of Russian military ranks
 Ranks and insignia of the Imperial Russian Armed Forces
 Military ranks of the Soviet Union (1918–1935)
 Military ranks of the Soviet Union (1935–1940)
 Military ranks of the Soviet Union (1940–1943)
 Military ranks of the Soviet Union (1955–1991)
 Ranks and insignia of the Russian Federation's armed forces 1994–2010

References 
Citations

References

Further reading
 

Russian Federation Army
Military ranks of the Soviet Union